The 2006 Tercera División play-offs to Segunda División B from Tercera División (Promotion play-offs) were the final playoffs for the promotion from 2005–06 Tercera División to 2006–07 Segunda División B. In some groups four teams took part in the play-off while other groups have only three.

The teams highlighted in yellow played the Liguilla de Ascenso to Segunda División B.
The teams highlighted in red were relegated to Regional Divisions.

Groups A
Teams from Galicia, Asturias, Castile-La Mancha and Madrid.

Group A1
1st Eliminatory:

2nd Eliminatory:

Promoted to Segunda División B:Cobeña

Group A2
1st Eliminatory:

2nd Eliminatory:

Promoted to Segunda División B:Lugo

Group A3
1st Eliminatory:

2nd Eliminatory:

Promoted to Segunda División B:Guijuelo

Group A4
1st Eliminatory:

2nd Eliminatory:

Promoted to Segunda División B:Universidad de Oviedo

Groups B
Teams of Cantabria, Basque Country, Navarre, La Rioja and Aragon.

Group B1
1st Eliminatory:

2nd Eliminatory:

Promoted to Segunda División B:CD Logroñés
Relegated to Regional Preferente:Universidad de Zaragoza (Zaragoza B was relegated from Segunda División B)

Group B2
1st Eliminatory:

2nd Eliminatory:

Promoted to Segunda División B:Sestao River Club

Group B3
1st Eliminatory:

2nd Eliminatory:

Promoted to Segunda División B:Gimnástica Torrelavega

Group B4
1st Eliminatory:

2nd Eliminatory:

Promoted to Segunda División B:UD Barbastro

Groups C
Teams of Catalonia, Valencia, Balearic Islands and Murcia.

Group C1
1st Eliminatory:

2nd Eliminatory:

Promoted to Segunda División B:Orihuela CF

Group C2
1st Eliminatory:

2nd Eliminatory:

Promoted to Segunda División B:CD Eldense

Group C3
1st Eliminatory:

2nd Eliminatory:

Promoted to Segunda División B:Valencia B

Group C4
1st Eliminatory:

2nd Eliminatory:

Promoted to Segunda División B:Espanyol B

Groups D
Teams of Eastern Andalusia, Western Andalusia, Extremadura and Castile-La Mancha.

Group D1
1st Eliminatory:

2nd Eliminatory:

Promoted to Segunda División B:CF Villanovense

Group D2
1st Eliminatory:

2nd Eliminatory:

Promoted to Segunda División B:Portuense

Group D3
1st Eliminatory:

2nd Eliminatory:

Promoted to Segunda División B:Granada CF

Group D4
1st Eliminatory:

2nd Eliminatory:

Promoted to Segunda División B:UD Puertollano

Group E
Teams of Canary Islands.

Group E
1st Eliminatory:

2nd Eliminatory:

Promoted to Segunda División B:CD Orientación Marítima

External links
Futbolme.com

2005-06
play
2006 Spanish football leagues play-offs